Events in the year 1968 in Bulgaria.

Incumbents 

 General Secretaries of the Bulgarian Communist Party: Todor Zhivkov
 Chairmen of the Council of Ministers: Todor Zhivkov

Events 

 July 28 – The 9th World Festival of Youth and Students was held in Sofia. The festival attracted 20,000 people from 138 countries.
 The Mantaritza Biosphere Reserve was established to protect the old coniferous forests and the biotopes of the Western capercaillie (Tetrao urogalus).

Sports

References 

 
1960s in Bulgaria
Years of the 20th century in Bulgaria
Bulgaria
Bulgaria